Jonathan Farrow (born 22 February 1984) was an English cricketer. He was a right-handed batsman and a right-arm medium-fast bowler who played for Cheshire. He was born in Stockport, Greater Manchester.

Farrow made two List A appearances for the side, in the C&G Trophy in August and September 2002. As a tailender, he did not bat in either match, though he bowled five overs in his debut, and ten in his second match.

External links
Jonathan Farrow at Cricket Archive

1984 births
Living people
English cricketers
Cheshire cricketers
People from Stockport